Viola Tricolor is an 1874 novella by the German writer Theodor Storm. It tells the story of a man who remarries after his wife has died, and how the new woman feels insufficient in her role as wife and mother to her step-daughter. The novella was first serialised in the journal Westermanns Monatshefte. An English translation by Bayard Quincy Morgan was published in 1956.

Adaptations
The novella has been adapted for film twice. Willi Forst's Serenade was released in 1938. Veit Harlan's I'll Carry You in My Hands stars Kristina Söderbaum, Hans Holt and Hans Nielsen and was released in 1958.

References

External links
 Viola Tricolor at Projekt Gutenberg-DE 

1874 German novels
German novels adapted into films
German-language novels
Novels by Theodor Storm
Novels first published in serial form